The I Royal Bavarian Army Corps / I Bavarian AK was a corps level command of the Royal Bavarian Army, part of the German Army, before and during World War I.

As part of the 1868 army reform, the I Royal Bavarian Army Corps of the Bavarian Army was set up in 1869 in Munich as the Generalkommando (headquarters) for the southern part of the Kingdom. With the formation of the III Royal Bavarian Corps in 1900, it was made responsible for Swabia and most of Upper and Lower Bavaria. Like all Bavarian formations, it was assigned to the IV Army Inspectorate. This became the 6th Army at the start of the First World War. The Corps was disbanded at the end of the war along with the Kingdom of Bavaria.

Franco-Prussian War 
The I Royal Bavarian Corps (along with the II Royal Bavarian Corps) participated in the Franco-Prussian War as part of the 3rd Army.

It initially fought in the battles of Worth, Beaumont and Bazeilles, where it lost about 7,000 men, it also fought at the decisive battle of Sedan. After Sedan, the Corps was responsible for the removal of prisoners and ensuring transport of the booty. Thereafter, it moved south of Paris to the Loire, to shield the army during the Siege of Paris. A newly formed French Corps gathered in the Orléans area, so the Corps was reinforced by the 17th Division, 22nd Division and two cavalry divisions. After the Battle of Artenay, Orléans was captured and the reinforcing divisions were removed so the Corps did not have them for the first battles against the Army of the Loire. As a result of the subsequent Battle of Coulmiers, Orléans was lost once again.

In the period from October to late December 1870, the Corps was on service without interruption, particularly from the beginning of November in the battles of Villepion, Loigny, Orléans and Beaugency, usually against a numerically superior enemy. The losses in December alone amounted to 5,600 men. A planned return to the siege army at Paris had to be postponed several times because the Bavarians could not be spared.

Peacetime organisation 
The 25 peacetime Corps of the German Army (Guards, I - XXI, I - III Bavarian) had a reasonably standardised organisation. Each consisted of two divisions with usually two infantry brigades, one field artillery brigade and a cavalry brigade each. Each brigade normally consisted of two regiments of the appropriate type, so each Corps normally commanded 8 infantry, 4 field artillery and 4 cavalry regiments. There were exceptions to this rule:
V, VI, VII, IX and XIV Corps each had a 5th infantry brigade (so 10 infantry regiments)
II, XIII, XVIII and XXI Corps had a 9th infantry regiment
I, VI and XVI Corps had a 3rd cavalry brigade (so 6 cavalry regiments)
the Guards Corps had 11 infantry regiments (in 5 brigades) and 8 cavalry regiments (in 4 brigades).
Each Corps also directly controlled a number of other units. This could include one or more
Foot Artillery Regiment
Jäger Battalion
Pioneer Battalion
Train Battalion

World War I

Organisation on mobilisation 
On mobilization, on 2 August 1914, the Corps was restructured. 1st Cavalry Brigade was withdrawn to form part of the Bavarian Cavalry Division and the 2nd Cavalry Brigade was broken up and its regiments assigned to the divisions as reconnaissance units. Divisions received engineer companies and other support units from the Corps headquarters. In summary, I Bavarian Corps mobilised with 25 infantry battalions, 8 machine gun companies (48 machine guns), 8 cavalry squadrons, 24 field artillery batteries (144 guns), 4 heavy artillery batteries (16 guns), 3 pioneer companies and an aviation detachment.

Combat chronicle 
On mobilisation, I Royal Bavarian Corps was assigned to the predominantly Bavarian 6th Army forming part of the left wing of the forces for the Schlieffen Plan offensive in August 1914. It was still in existence at the end of the war in the 18th Army, Heeresgruppe Deutscher Kronprinz on the Western Front.

Commanders 
The I Royal Bavarian Corps had the following commanders during its existence:

Headquarters staff during World War I
From 2 August 1914, its headquarters staff were:
 Commanding General: Gen. d. Inf. Oskar Ritter v. Xylander, Gen.-Lt. Nikolaus Ritter v. Endres as Führer from 23 June 1918
 Chief of General Staff: Gen.-Maj. Karl Frhr. v. Nagel zu Aichberg, Gen.-Maj. Möhl from 6 March 1915, Maj. Ludwig Graf v. Holnstein from Bavaria from 13 September 1916, Oberstlt. Friedrich Haack from 29 May 1918.
 General staff: Maj. Hans Hemmer, Hptm. Wilhelm Leeb, Hptm. Otto Frhr. v. Berchem, Hptm. Karl Deuringer
 Commander of Engineers: Major Georg Vogl

See also 

Bavarian Army
Franco-Prussian War order of battle
German Army order of battle (1914)
German Army order of battle, Western Front (1918)
List of Imperial German infantry regiments
List of Imperial German artillery regiments
List of Imperial German cavalry regiments

Notes

References

Bibliography 
 von Dellmensingen Konrad Krafft & Feeser Friedrichfranz; Das Bayernbuch vom Weltkriege 1914-1918, Chr. Belser AG, Verlagsbuchhandlung, Stuttgart 1930
 
 
 
 
 

Corps of Germany in World War I
Military units and formations of Bavaria
1869 establishments in Bavaria
Military units and formations established in 1869
Military units and formations disestablished in 1919